Sanskrit revival is the accumulation of attempts at reviving Sanskrit that have been undertaken. This revival is happening not only in India but also in Western countries like Germany, the United Kingdom, the United States and in many European countries.

Sanskrit is one of the 22 official languages in India. In 2010, Uttarakhand became the first state in India to have Sanskrit as its second official language. In 2019, Himachal Pradesh became the second state to have Sanskrit as the second official language. There are 2,360,821 total speakers of Sanskrit in India, as of 2011. However, despite attempts at revival, there are no first language speakers of Sanskrit in India. In each of India's recent decennial censuses, several thousand citizens have reported Sanskrit to be their mother tongue, but the numbers are thought to signify a wish to be aligned with the prestige of the language.

History
In 1891 there was organized activity among the Theosophists in India promoting and participating in the revival of Sanskrit. In 1894 the American Asiatic and Sanskrit Revival Society was established.

In the Republic of India Sanskrit is included in the 14 original languages of the Eighth Schedule to the Constitution. Many organizations, like the Samskrta Bharati, are conducting Speak Sanskrit workshops to popularize the language. The All-India Sanskrit Festival (since 2002) holds composition contests. The 1991 Indian census reported 49,736 fluent speakers of Sanskrit.

The state of Uttarakhand has become the first state in India to declare Sanskrit as an official language. The Central Board of Secondary Education in India has made Sanskrit a third language in the schools it governs (though it is an option for a school to adopt it or not, the other choice being the state's own official language). In such schools, learning Sanskrit is an option for grades 5 to 8 (Classes V to VIII). This is true of most schools, including but not limited to Christian missionary schools, affiliated to the ICSE board too, especially in those states where the official language is Hindi. An option between Sanskrit and a local language as a second language exists for grades 9 and 10.

Sanskrit revival movements

Sanskrit literature movement

There is a Sanskrit literature movement to revive Sanskrit.

The Indian Council for Cultural Relations (ICCR) has started giving "World Sanskrit Award" to eminent Sanskrit scholars to recognise their outstanding contribution to the study, teaching, research in Sanskrit language and literature. Princess Maha Chakri Sirindhorn of Thailand was conferred the first ‘World Sanskrit Award’ in 2016. In 2017, Robert Goldman was awarded the World Sanskrit Award.

There are also many Sanskrit writers who won Sahitya Akademi Award winners.

Global organisations

Samskrita Bharati is an organization working for Sanskrit revival. It is a tax exempt nonprofit organization with its headquarters in New Delhi, India. The International Centre, Aksharam, a complex located in Bangalore, India, is its international centre. It houses a research wing, a library, audio-visual lab, and staff quarters. It also has several state-units spread across the country both in the United States and India. The US chapter is a registered nonprofit tax-exempt organization with its headquarters in San Jose, California. Samskrita Bharati functions as an umbrella organization for various organizations working for promotion of Samskrita. Being the liturgical language of Hindus, it is used during worship in Hindu temples in the West. It is taught in many South Asian studies/linguistics departments in universities across the West. Also, Sanskrit revival attempts are underway amongst expatriate Hindu populations in the west. It is also popular amongst the many practitioners of yoga in the West, who find the language useful in understanding the Yoga Sutra .

Bharatiya Vidya Bhavan is an India educational trust. It was founded on 7 November 1938 by K. M. Munshi, with the support of Mahatma Gandhi. The trust programmes through its 119 centres in India, seven centres abroad and 367 constituent institutions. One of its purposes is the promotion of Sanskrit over "all aspects of life from the cradle to the grave and beyond" – thus filling "a growing vacuum in modern life".

Modern Sanskrit universities in India 

In the last few years sporadic efforts have been made to form Sanskrit universities for Sanskrit studies and vyakarana in India. The Sanskrit Universities Bill is aimed at converting Sanskrit deemed to be universities to central universities. The partial list of such universities is given below in chronological order:

Sanskrit revival by states of India

Vedic & sanskrit school education board

The Maharshi Sandipani Rashtriya Veda Sanskrit Shiksha Board (MSRVSSB) is a national-level school education board which grants the Veda Bhushan (10th) and Veda Vibhushan (12th) certificates to the students of affiliated schools. MSRVSSB certificates are accredited by the  Association of Indian Universities (AIU) and AICTE as the recognised qualifications for admission into other tertiary institutions for a higher degree. Along with the modern subjects, the students are also taught Hindu scriptures, vedas, upnishads, ayurveda and sanskrit.

Andhra Pradesh
Andhra Pradesh has several dozens Sanskrit institutes, including the Rashtriya Sanskrit Vidyapeetha and Rashtriya Sanskrit Vidyapeetha (deemed university) at Tirupati.

Assam and Northeast India
Assam and Northeast India, where Sanskrit has reached by the late vedic period, has Kamarupa Anusandhan Samiti which was established in 2012 to research Sanskrit, Ananda Ram Baruah institute of languages publishes Sanskrit manuscripts, and Assam Sanskrit Board is responsible for researching and preserving Sanskrit documents and manuscripts.

Bihar
Bihar has Sanskrit institutes like Kameshwar Singh Darbhanga Sanskrit University.

Delhi
Delhi has at Delhi University, Rashtriya Sanskrit Sansthan and Shri Lal Bahadur Shastri Rashtriya Sanskrit Vidyapeetha (deemed university) undertaking research and teaching in Sanskrit.

Gujarat
Gujarat has Shree Somnath Sanskrit University and 50 Sanskrit pathshalas (schools) of which 38 are officially recognised by the government.

Haryana
Haryana state has over 24 Sanskrit colleges offering education equivalent to bachelor's degree, additionally masters and doctoral level degrees are also offered by the Kurukshetra University and Maharshi Dayanand University. In 2018, Haryana established Maharishi Balmiki Sanskrit University, Kaithal as a teaching and affiliating university for research in Sanskrit, vedas, Indic languages, Indian culture and Indian philosophy.

Himachal Pradesh 
Himachal Pradesh has many Sanskrit institutes. In 2019 the Himachal Pradesh government decided to make Sanskrit the second official language replacing Punjabi. Also, Himachal Pradesh government has plans to teach Sanskrit as a compulsory language from 3rd to 5th standards.  Currently Sanskrit is taught from 5th to 10th standards in the state. The state government has also intended to open a Sanskrit university to revive the language in the state.
Some believe the move was controversial as is aimed at Sanskritisation of the province and rather than revival of Sanskrit, the Western Pahari language should have been revived which is the local language system  of the province written originally in Takri script.

Kerala 
Kerala has many Sanskrit institutes, including Sree Sankaracharya University of Sanskrit.

Madhya Pradesh 
Madhya Pradesh has many Sanskrit institutes, including Maharishi Sandipani Rashtriya Ved Vidya Pratishthan and Maharishi Panini Sanskrit Evam Vedic Vishwavidyalaya.

Maharashtra 
Maharashtra has Sanskrit institutes like Kavikulaguru Kalidas Sanskrit University.

Odisha 
Odisha has many Sanskrit institutes, including Shri Jagannath Sanskrit Vishvavidayalaya.

Rajasthan 
Rajasthan has Jagadguru Ramanandacharya Rajasthan Sanskrit University.

Tamil Nadu 
Tamil Nadu has many Sanskrit institutes, including the Madras Sanskrit College established in 1906.

Uttar Pradesh 
Uttar Pradesh has Sampurnanand Sanskrit University.

West Bengal
West Bengal has at least four universities with Sanskrit departments.

Revival outside India
Over 100 institutes outside India offer academic studies in Sanskrit:

South Asia
 Bangladesh: Bangladesh Sanskrit and Pali Education Board
 Nepal: Nepal Sanskrit University was established in 1986 at Beljhundi in Dang district; several gompas also undertake teaching of Sanskrit texts at the primary and secondary school level. Rangjung Yeshe Institute also offers Sanskrit classes. See also List of Buddhist colleges and universities in Nepal.
 Sri Lanka: several institutes, including over a dozen universities, offer bachelor's, master's and doctoral degrees in Sanskrit.

Indosphere
The following nations in the Indosphere offer opportunities for Sanskrit studies:

 Bhutan: Nalanda Buddhist Institute undertakes teaching of Sanskrit texts
 Cambodia: After the fall of Angkor Empire in the 14th century, Buddhist monks started learning Sanskrit from early the 20th century, and academic teaching of Sanskrit in modern universities in Cambodia was recommenced in the 1980s at Preah Sihanouk Raja Buddhist University and several public universities including Royal University of Fine Arts and the Royal University of Phnom Penh. Native Cambodian Indologists like Dr Ms. Kunthea Chhom, who has MA in Sanskrit from Magadh University in India and PhD in Sanskrit epigraphy from École pratique des hautes études in France, are trying to revive the study of Sanskrit among Cambodians.
 China: Beijing University
Hong Kong: The Centre of Buddhist Studies of University of Hong Kong offers Sanskrit courses.
 Indonesia: the Udayana University of Bali established a "Chairs of Indian studies" in 2013 which also offers a Sanskrit course in Denpasar with the help of the Indian government. Several educational institutions in Indonesia have also been teaching Sanskrit and Balinese Hinduism such as the State Hindu College of Tampung Penyang (a state-owned Hindu institute in Central Kalimantan), the Gde Pudja Hindu State Institute in Mataram city, and many more. In 2019, the Bali TV has been conducting Sanskrit lessons for Hindu locals in Bali. Indonesian languages are heavily influenced by Sanskrit and have numerous Sanskrit loanwords, mottoes of institutes and ancient inscriptions. 
 Japan: Kyoto University
 Laos: Buddhist studies such as Sanskrit and Pali are usually undertaken at Buddhist monasteries, such as Vientiane Sangha College and Champasak Sangha College.
 Malaysia: See also Sanskrit inscriptions in the Malay world and Sanskrit loanwords in Malay.
 Myanmar: Sanskrit is mandatory at the bachelor's and master's degree level in the State Pariyatti Sasana University, Mandalay and State Pariyatti Sasana University, Yangon.
 Philippines: See also list of Sanskrit loanwords in Tagalog.
 Singapore: Yale-NUS College of National University of Singapore and Yale University and Singapore University of Technology and Design offer Sanskrit studies, Global Indian International School has made NCERT-based Sanskrit a mandatory subject for 1,800 primary school students in Singapore, and Ramakrishna Mission at Bartley Road has been holding weekly Sanskrit classes for over 50 schoolchildren for over 40 years.
 South Korea: Dongguk University offers Buddhist studies including Pali and Sanskrit texts.
 Taiwan: National Taiwan University and Fo Guang University of Fo Guang Shan monastic Buddhist order also offer bachelors, masters and doctoral degrees in Sanskrit.
 Thailand: hosts the annual World Sanskrit Conference and several universities offer Sanskrit studies at bachelors, masters and higher degree level such as Silpakorn University, Chulalongkorn University, Mahidol University and many more.
 Vietnam: under pressure from Buddhist monks, a Khmer Buddhist Studies Institute of Southern Vietnam (called  in Khmer language) was opened in 2007 on 12 ha land of Wat Sanvoar by the government in the Ô Môn District of Cần Thơ province to teach Sanskrit and Buddhist subjects in Khmer language at university level. There are three more Buddhist institutes, one each at Hanoi, Mỹ Sơn and Saigon, in the Vietnamese language. Cham Hindus, also called Balamon Chams, who mostly reside in Bình Thuận Province and Ninh Thuận Province, are practicing Hindus in Vietnam.

Africa
The following nations in Africa offer opportunities for Sanskrit studies:

 South Africa: St James Preparatory Schools in Cape Town, Durban and Johannesburg offer Sanskrit classes.

Americas
The following nations in the Americas offer opportunities for Sanskrit studies:

 Brazil: University of São Paulo
 Canada: Concordia University, McGill University, McMaster University, University of British Columbia, University of Calgary, University of Saskatchewan, University of Toronto.
 Mexico: El Colegio de Mexico
 USA: as of 2007, there are about 36 universities which offer Sanskrit education including Johns Hopkins University and Harvard University. In the United States, since September 2009, high school students have been able to receive credits as independent study or toward foreign-language requirements by studying Sanskrit, as part of the SAFL: Samskritam as a Foreign Language program coordinated by Samskrita Bharati. The Hindu University of America (HUA) offers several courses in written and spoken Samskritam (Sanskrit) as well as Sanskrit based courses on the Bhagavad-Gita, Upanishads and other Sanskrit literature and works.

Arab and Middle East
The following nations in the Middle East offer opportunities for Sanskrit studies:

 Israel: Hebrew University of Jerusalem and Tel-Aviv University.
 Oman: Indian School

Europe
The following nations in Europe offer opportunities for Sanskrit studies, most notably Germany, France, UK, Italy and the Netherlands:

 Austria: University of Vienna offers Sanskrit courses.
 Belgium: Ghent University and Louvain University.
 Denmark: University of Copenhagen
 Finland: University of Helsinki
 France: University of Paris, University of Lyon, University of Lille, University of Provence, and École pratique des hautes études.
 Germany: as of 2015, there are 14 German universities teaching the Sanskrit language. Free University of Berlin, Bonn University, Freiburg University, University of Göttingen, Halle University, Hamburg University, Heidelberg University, Kiel University, Leipzig University, Mainz University, Marburg University, Munich University, University of Tübingen, and University of Würzburg. Shree Somnath Sanskrit University at Rajkot signed a MoU with 3 German universities, Heidelberg University, Wurzburg University and Leipzig University, for student and academic exchange.
 Great Britain: In the UK there are four universities which teach Sanskrit including University of Oxford, University of Edinburgh, Cambridge University, and London University. SOAS University of London too offers a bachelor's degree in Sanskrit. St James Junior School in London, England, offers Sanskrit as part of the curriculum.
 Italy: University of Bologna, University of Rome, University of Milan, Università Cattolica del Sacro Cuore, University of Venice, University of Bologna, University of Pisa, University of Naples, University of Cagliari, University of Florence, University of Palermo, and University of Turin.
 Netherlands: Groningen University, Leiden University, and Kern Institute. International Institute for Asian Studies.
 Norway: Oslo University.
 Poland: Warsaw University, Jagiellonian University, Adam Mickiewicz University, University of Wrocław, Catholic University of Lublin
 Portugal: University of Lisbon
 Russia: Moscow State University, Saint Petersburg State University
 Spain: University of Salamanca
 Sweden: Stockholm University, and Uppsala University.
 Switzerland: Lausanne University, Zurich University, University of Münster.
 Altindische Grammatik was written by Swiss Indologist Jacob Wackernagel.

Oceania
The following nations in Oceania offer opportunities for Sanskrit studies:

 Australia: Australian National University, La Trobe University, University of Queensland and University of Sydney (Department of Indian Subcontinental Studies) offer Sanskrit courses. The revival of Sanskrit is also driven by the Australian Indian migrants. In Australia, the Sydney private boys' high school Sydney Grammar School offers Sanskrit from years 7 through to 12, including for the Higher School Certificate. Other schools included the John Colet School, Sydney, Australia; Erasmus School, Melbourne, Australia.
 Fiji: Bharat Sevashram Sangha organises Sanskrit lessons for students across several cities. University of Fiji also has the "Department of Hindi Language and Culture".
 New Zealand: several universities teach Sanskrit including Massey University, University of Auckland, and University of Otago. Ficino School, Mt Eden in Auckland teaches Sanskrit to students to improve English.

See also

 List of Sanskrit loanwords in English
 List of Sanskrit loanwords in Hindi
 List of Sanskrit loanwords in Indonesian
 List of Sanskrit loanwords in Tagalog
 List of Sanskrit poets
 List of languages by first written accounts

Notes

References

Further reading
 Rajiv Malhotra (2016), Battle for Sanskrit: Dead or Alive, Oppressive or Liberating, Political or Sacred? (Publisher: HarperCollins India)

External links
 Sanskrit studies in Calcutta
 Graduate studies in Sanskrit

Sanskrit revival